Davy Rouyard (born 17 August 1999) is a French professional footballer who plays as a goalkeeper for Championnat National 3 side Bordeaux B.

Career 
Rouyard made his professional debut for Bordeaux in a 3–0 Coupe de France loss to Brest on 2 January 2022.

References

External links 
 
 

1999 births
Living people
Guadeloupean footballers
French footballers
French people of Guadeloupean descent
Black French sportspeople
Association football goalkeepers
FC Girondins de Bordeaux players
Championnat National 3 players